Chirkey is a rural locality (a selo) in Buynaksky District of the Republic of Dagestan, Russia. Population:   See also Chirkey Dam.

References

Rural localities in Buynaksky District